The 1967–68 season was Aberdeen's 55th season in the top flight of Scottish football and their 57th season overall. Aberdeen competed in the Scottish League Division One, Scottish League Cup, Scottish Cup and in European competition for the first time in the Dons' history when they competed in the European Cup Winners' Cup.

Results

Own goal scorers in italics.

Division 1

Final standings

Scottish League Cup

Group 2

Group 2 final table

Scottish Cup

European Cup Winners' Cup

References

AFC Heritage Trust

Aberdeen F.C. seasons
Aber